Hongos District is one of thirty-three districts of the province Yauyos in Peru.

References